XHMS-FM is a radio station on 99.5 FM in Monclova, Coahuila. It is owned by Radio Medios de Monclova and carries a pop/adult contemporary format known as Súper FM.

History
XHMS, the first FM radio station in Coahuila, was approved to begin operations on December 8, 1965, received its concession on April 15, 1966, and signed on May 5 of that year. Named for founder Melchor Sánchez Dovalina, XHMS started on 99.3 MHz with a power of 250 watts, later increased to 310. In the 1980s, XHMS moved to 99.5 and increased its power to 1.9 kW.

References

External links
Super FM 99.5 Facebook

Radio stations in Coahuila